The 2016 European Archery Championships is  the 24th edition of the European Archery Championships. The event was held in Nottingham, United Kingdom from May 23 to 29, 2016.

Medal summary

Recurve

Compound

Medal table

References

External links
Official site

European Archery Championships
2016 in archery
2016 in European sport
International archery competitions hosted by the United Kingdom